Hyundai Engineering and Construction Co., Ltd. (HDEC) is a major construction company in South Korea.  The company was founded by Chung Ju-yung in 1947 as the Hyundai Civil Works Company and was a major component of the Hyundai Group. Hyundai Construction and Hyundai Engineering merged in 1999.

Hyundai Construction played a major role in the importation of Korean laborers to the Middle East to work on construction projects in the 1970s and 1980s.  In the decade following 1975, Hyundai signed their first contract in the region for construction of a shipyard for the Iranian Navy near Bandar-e Abbas.  800,000 Koreans went to work in Saudi Arabia and another 25,000 went to Iran; Hyundai was their largest employer.

Under creditors' management with Korea Exchange Bank as the largest creditor, Hyundai Group was split into several entities from 2001 to 2006. As of March 2007, HDEC is the main shareholder of Hyundai Merchant Marine, which is the de facto holding company of Hyundai Group.  Hyundai Group and Hyundai Motor Group (another spin-off from Hyundai Group) are both vying to purchase HDEC.

In 2011, Hyundai Motor Group became the new owner of Hyundai Eng. & Const.,co.,Ltd. This was determined by Korean banks' decision after defeating Hyundai (Merchant marine: the 2nd largest shipping co., in Korea after Hanjin shipping) Group.

Key landmark construction sites
Bangabandhu Bridge, Bangladesh
Kyeong-bu (Seoul-Busan) express way
North Han river, Soyanggang Dam, multipurpose Dam
Seoul Gangnam apartment introduction in Korea during 1970
Hyundai Ulsan shipyard
Hyundai Motor Ulsan complex
Ulsan Industrial complex
Posco Giant Pohang and Gwangyang (South-west of Korean peninsula) com
Jabel Ali Industrial harbour construction
Suntec City tower project, Singapore
Ulsan Grand Bridge
Geogeum Grand Bridge
Masan Changwon Grand Bridge
Sheikh Jaber Al-Ahmad Al-Sabah Causeway, Kuwait

Notable people
The former president of South Korea, Lee Myung-bak, was a former CEO of Hyundai Engineering and Construction.

See also

 Suwon Hyundai Engineering & Construction
 Economy of South Korea
 CentGas consortium
 List of companies of South Korea

References

External links
 
 Hyundai Engineering & Construction  FB Page

Construction and civil engineering companies of South Korea
Companies based in Seoul
Companies listed on the Korea Exchange
Construction and civil engineering companies established in 1947
Hyundai Motor Group
South Korean companies established in 1947